Greyrock Mountain is a mountain summit in the Laramie Mountains range of the Rocky Mountains of North America.

Hiking
The summit of Greyrock Mountain can be reached via the popular Greyrock Mountain National Recreation Trail.

See also

List of Colorado mountain ranges
List of Colorado mountain summits
List of Colorado fourteeners
List of Colorado 4000 meter prominent summits
List of the most prominent summits of Colorado
List of Colorado county high points

References

External links

Mountains of Colorado
Mountains of Larimer County, Colorado
Roosevelt National Forest
North American 2000 m summits